(born March 25, 1982) is a Japanese actor and singer. He played Takashi Kawamura in The Prince of Tennis musical series, Tenimyu and the live film adaptation.

Career
Kotani played a transvestite in TKO Hip Hop.

Kotani portrayed Takashi Kawamura, the soft-spoken, dual-personality 3rd year regular of Seigaku Middle School's tennis club, in The Prince of Tennis musicals, Tenimyu. From 2005 to 2006, he was the fourth actor to play Kawamura as a member of the second-generation Seigaku cast. He made his debut as Kawamura on January 8, 2005 in the Side Yamabuki performance in Osaka. That same year, his role as Kawamura carried into the live adaptation film of the manga.

On March 29, 2006, in the Dream Live 3rd Live concert, Kotani, along with the majority of the Seigaku cast, graduated from their roles.

Kotani carried his role from the musicals to the live-adaptation film of The Prince of Tennis. He reprised his role in the movie. The Prince of Tennis was released on May 13, 2006 and opened in the tenth spot of the Japanese box office.

Kotani starred in the made-for DVD release tokusatsu series, ZanSaber, as a tokusatsu hero. ZanSaber was released on November 18, 2006.

Kotani's next project was filming for the made-for DVD release movie, Boys Love, which co-starred Takumi Saito. Kotani plays Mamiya Taishin, a magazine editor who meets high-school model, Kisaragi Noeru (Takumi), during a magazine interview. Boys Love was released on November 24, 2006.

In 2007, Kotani took the lead in the theatrical edition of Boys Love, which shared only its title with the 2006 movie, and featured a new story and cast. Kotani portrayed Aoi Kairu, a young teacher at an all-boys boarding school, who discovers that his new student, Sora Amakami (Atsumi Kanno) is the boy with whom he recently had a sexual encounter. The movie costarred Yuuki Kawakubo and, in smaller roles, Toru Baba and Renn Kiriyama.

In 2007, Kotani appeared in the film, the live-action adaptation of the 1982 to 1988 manga series, Aratanaru Shobaku by Satosi Yoshida. The film was released in April 2007. Kotani acted alongside Yuu Shirota, Masaki Kaji, Kousuke Kujirai and Kenta Kamakari.

Kotani is a member of +Plus, a J-pop band that does opening and ending songs for anime. Their latest anime was Hitman REBORN. +PLUS released four albums.

Personal life

Kotani began dating former Morning Musume member Risa Niigaki after they starred in the stage play Absolute Boyfriend in 2013. After two years of dating, they married on July 11, 2016. On January 6, 2018, their blogs announced that they were filing for divorce.

Discography
2007 – "Going to the Road" was his first solo single, that also included "Irotodori no Sekai".

Filmography

Theatre
2003 – 年秋公演「ANGEL29X99」にて客演ANGEL

Musicals
TENIMYU: THE PRINCE OF TENNIS MUSICAL SERIES (as Takashi Kawamura)
The Prince of Tennis Musical: Side Yamabuki feat. St. Rudolph (In Winter of 2004–2005)
The Prince of Tennis Musical: Dream Live 2nd (2005)
The Prince of Tennis Musical: The Imperial Match Hyotei Gakuen (2005)
The Prince of Tennis Musical: The Imperial Match Hyotei Gakuen in Winter (In Winter of 2005–2006)
The Prince of Tennis Musical: Dream Live 3rd (2006)

Awards
1999 JUNON SUPER BOY Contest – 5th Place

See also
 Tenimyu
 The Prince of Tennis Movie
 The Prince of Tennis
 Takashi Kawamura (The Prince of Tennis)
 Plus (band)

References

Wikipedia Japanese article on 小谷嘉一

External links
 Kotani's Official Blog
 Kotani's official website
 
 
 Kotani's Personal Blog

1982 births
Living people
Japanese male actors